The Schizoserideae are a tribe of algae in the family Delesseriaceae.

References

Delesseriaceae